The Education Secretary of Pakistan is the Federal Secretary for Ministry of Federal Education and Professional Training. The position is occupied by a BPS-22 grade officer, usually belonging to the Pakistan Administrative Service.

The Secretary heads the Ministry which is mandated to prepare policy direction for preparing and training of the country's manpower to meet national and international demands for skilled workforce. After the Eighteenth Amendment to the Constitution of Pakistan in 2010, the subject of education was devolved from the federal government to the provincial governments, which has drastically reduced the powers and mandate of the Federal Education Secretary.

The Secretary 
The current Education Secretary is Naheed Shah Durrani.

See also
Health Secretary of Pakistan
Foreign Secretary of Pakistan
Finance Secretary of Pakistan
Defence Secretary of Pakistan
Ministry of Federal Education and Professional Training

References 

Ministry of Education (Pakistan)